This is a list of the members of the European Parliament for France in the 1999 to 2004 session.

See also
 Members of the European Parliament 1999–2004
List of members of the European Parliament, 1999–2004 - for a full alphabetical list
 1999 European Parliament election in France

References 

1999
List
France